The Communications Workers of America (CWA) is the largest communications and media labor union in the United States, representing about 700,000 members in both the private and public sectors (also in Canada and Puerto Rico). The union has 27 locals in Canada via CWA-SCA Canada representing about 8,000 members. CWA  has several affiliated subsidiary labor unions bringing total membership to over 700,000. CWA is headquartered in Washington, D.C., and affiliated with the AFL–CIO, the Strategic Organizing Center the Canadian Labour Congress, and UNI Global Union. The current president is Chris Shelton.

History
In 1918 telephone operators organized under the Telephone Operators Department of the International Brotherhood of Electrical Workers. While initially successful at organizing, the union was damaged by a 1923 strike and subsequent AT&T lockout. After AT&T installed company-controlled Employees' Committees, the Telephone Operators Department eventually disbanded. The CWA's roots lie in the 1938 reorganization of telephone workers into the National Federation of Telephone Workers after the Wagner Act outlawed such employees' committees or "company unions". NFTW was a federation of sovereign local independent unions that lacked authority over the affiliated local unions leaving it at a serious organizational disadvantage. After losing a strike with AT&T in 1947, the federation led by Joseph A. Beirne,  reorganized as CWA, a truly national union, which affiliated with the Congress of Industrial Organizations in 1949.

CWA has continued to expand into areas beyond traditional telephone service. In 1994 the National Association of Broadcast Employees and Technicians merged with the CWA and became The Broadcasting and Cable Television Workers Sector of the CWA, NABET-CWA. Since 1997, it includes The Newspaper Guild (now renamed The NewsGuild-CWA).  In 2004, the Association of Flight Attendants merged with CWA, and became formally known as the Association of Flight Attendants-CWA, or AFA-CWA. In 2020 CWA launched the Campaign to Organize Digital Employees (CODE-CWA) initiative to unionize tech, video game, and digital workers which has led to CWA becoming a major union for US and Canada tech worker organizing, including organizing all non-management workers at the Hawaiʻi digital wireless carrier Mobi in 2022.

Contracts and strikes
Following is a partial list of contracts and strikes that the Communications Workers of America were involved in:

Composition

Membership

According to CWA's Department of Labor records since 2006, when membership classifications were first reported, the total reported membership has varied greatly and unpredictably due to the addition and removal of reported membership categories. As of 2014, around 27%, or a fourth, of the union's total membership are classified as "non-dues-paying retirees", and not eligible to vote in the union. The other, voting eligible, classifications are "active" (65%) and "dues-paying retired" (8%). CWA contracts also cover some non-members, known as agency fee payers, which number comparatively about 7% of the size of the union's membership. This accounts for 166,491 "non-dues-paying retirees" and 52,240 "dues-paying retirees", plus about 43,353 non-members paying agency fees, compared to 404,289 "active" members.

Affiliates
 Association of Flight Attendants (AFA-CWA) represents over 55,000 flight attendants at 22 airlines. Established in 1945, it affiliated with the CWA in 2004.
 CODE-CWA (Campaign to Organize Digital Employees)
 International Union of Electronic, Electrical, Salaried, Machine and Furniture Workers (IUE-CWA) represents over 45,000 manufacturing and industrial workers and affiliated with CWA in 2000.
 The NewsGuild (TNG-CWA) represents over 26,000 journalists and media workers at wire services, newspapers, magazines, and broadcast news. Established in 1933, it affiliated with the CWA in 1995.
 National Association of Broadcast Employees and Technicians (NABET-CWA) represents over 10,000 workers employed in the broadcasting, distributing, telecasting, recording, cable, video, sound recording and related industries. Established in 1934, it affiliated with the CWA in 1994.
 CWA Public, Healthcare and Education Workers represents more than 140,000 workers including social workers, educators, and health care providers, including state workers across New Jersey.
 Printing, Publishing and Media Workers Sector (PPMWS-CWA) was formed from the merger of the International Typographical Union printers. PPMWS-CWA represents over 8,000 workers in a diverse range of occupations in daily newspapers, commercial printing and mailing operations, and graphic design.
University Professional and Technical Employees (UPTE-CWA) represents over 16,000 clinical lab technicians, computer resource specialists, editors, lab assistants, museum scientists, social workers, staff research associates, student affairs officers, and writers at all campuses and medical centers of the University of California. Established in 1990, it affiliated with the CWA in 1993.

Leadership

Presidents
1947: Joseph A. Beirne
1974: Glenn Watts
1985: Morton Bahr
2005: Larry Cohen
2015: Chris Shelton

Secretary-Treasurers
1947: Carlton W. Werkau
1955: William A. Smallwood
1969: Glenn Watts
1974: Louis Knecht
1985: James E. Booe
1992: Barbara Easterling
2008: Jeff Rechenbach
2015: Sara Steffens

Further reading
 Bahr, Morton. From the Telegraph to the Internet: A 60 Year History of the CWA. Washington, D.C.: Welcome Rain Publishers, 1998. 
 Palladino, Grace. Dreams of Dignity, Workers of Vision: A History of the International Brotherhood of Electrical Workers. Washington, D.C.: International Brotherhood of Electrical Workers, 1991.
 Schacht, John N. The Making of Telephone Unionism, 1920–1947. New Brunswick, N.J.: Rutgers University Press, 1985.

References

External links

 
 Communications Workers of America-Syndicat des communications d’Amérique
 CWA Timeline
Communications Workers of America-Syndicat des communications d’Amérique – Web Archive created by the University of Toronto Libraries
IUE-CWA (International Union of Electronic, Electrical, Salaried, Machine and Furniture Workers)
 
Communications Workers of America Records, Tamiment Library & Robert F. Wagner Labor Archives, New York University
Communications Workers of America Audio Tape Inventory, Tamiment Library & Robert F. Wagner Labor Archives, New York University
Communications Workers of America Records Addendum, Tamiment Library & Robert F. Wagner Labor Archives, New York University
Communications Workers of America Photographs and Videos, Tamiment Library & Robert F. Wagner Labor Archives, New York University

 
Canadian Labour Congress
AFL–CIO
Communications trade unions
Congress of Industrial Organizations
Trade unions established in 1947
1947 establishments in the United States